Teackle Turner Wescott was a soldier, school superintendent and state legislator in Virginia. He represented Accomack County in the Virginia House of Delegates from 1883 to 1887. He was a Lieutenant in the Accomack regiment of the Confederate States Army. He lived in Grangerville. He married and had two daughters.

He was the maternal grandfather of John Teackle Holland.

References

Virginia politicians
Year of birth missing (living people)
Living people